Pachycladon (with synonyms Cheesemania and Ischnocarpus) is a genus of flowering plants of the family Brassicaceae, native to Tasmania and the South Island of New Zealand. It contains the following species:
 Pachycladon cheesemanii 
 Pachycladon crenatum 
 Pachycladon enysii 
 Pachycladon exilis 
 Pachycladon fasciarium 
 Pachycladon fastigiatum 
 Pachycladon latesiliquum 
 Pachycladon novae-zelandiae 
 Pachycladon radicatum 
 Pachycladon stellatum 
 Pachycladon wallii

References

Further reading
 Potentially species-variable DNA regions of Cheesemania 'Chalk Range'
 A new species combination in Cheesemania (Brassicaceae) from New Zealand P.B. Heenana and P.J. Garnock‐Jonesb, 1999.
 Gender dimorphism in Cheesemania wallii (Brassicaceae) P.J. Garnock-Jonesa, 1991.

Brassicaceae genera
Brassicaceae